Marijus Adomaitis (born 19 January 1983), better known by his stage names Ten Walls or Mario Basanov, is a Lithuanian producer who is best known for his 2014 single "Walking with Elephants", which peaked at number 2 on the UK Singles Chart.

In June 2015, Ten Walls was dropped from several festivals and by his booking agency after making controversial comments comparing gay people to pedophiles in a Facebook post, and referring to the LGBT community as a "different breed".

Career

2009–12: Mario Basanov 
In 2012 under the name Mario Basanov Adomaitis won Best Electronic Act at Lithuanian M.A.M.A. music awards.

2013–15: Breakthrough
On 10 May 2013 Ten Walls released his debut EP Gotham. On 9 December 2013 he released his debut single "Requiem". On 7 September 2014 he released the single "Walking with Elephants". On 10 September 2014 the song was at number 3 on The Official Chart Update in the UK. On 14 September 2014 the song entered the UK Singles Chart at number 6. The song also peaked at number 3 on the UK Dance Chart and number 8 on the Scottish Singles Chart.

Homophobia controversy
In June 2015, Ten Walls posted a rant on his Facebook pages condemning homosexuality and comparing it to pedophilia. According to the Gay Star News, the post stated: "I remember producing music for one Lithuanian musician, who tried to wash my brain that I don't need to be so conservative and intolerant about [gay people]. When I asked him 'what would you do if you realized that your 16-year-old son's browny (anus) is ripped by his boyfriend?' Well he was silent. In the good 90s ... these people of different breed were fixed. One of my first gigs in Ireland, on my way to my hotel I saw a church with a fence decorated with hundreds of baby shoes.  Unfortunately a priest's lie for many years was uncovered when children were massively raped. Unfortunately the people of other breed continue to do it and everyone knows it but does nothing." As a result of his comments, he was dropped from several festival line-ups. His booking agency, Coda Music Agency, announced that they no longer represented him. Fort Romeau pulled his support for him at London club venue Koko.

Ten Walls' posts were later deleted after a backlash, and he put out an apology claiming that he cancelled the festival dates himself. Organizers of Dutch festival Pitch, Belgian festival Pukkelpop, the German festival Dockville, British festival Creamfields, and Spanish festival Sónar publicly confirmed that they cancelled Ten Walls performances due to his homophobic statements. Ten Walls also received criticism from Lithuanian LGBT activists.

Three months after his post, in September 2015, Ten Walls issued a formal apology for the incident, calling it "completely out of character".

Discography

Studio albums

Extended plays

Singles

Awards 
On 30 January 2015 at M.A.M.A. awards Ten Walls won awards for best electronic act and best music video ("Walking with Elephants").

References

Notes
A  Did not appear in the official Belgian Ultratop 50 charts, but rather in the bubbling under Ultratip charts. Added 50 position to actual Ultratip position.

External links
 Ten Walls on SoundCloud

Living people
1983 births
Musicians from Vilnius